JumpJet Rex is a 2D platform game developed and published by TreeFortress Games. The game was released for Windows, OS X and Linux in April 2015. An Xbox One version was later released in April 2016 with a PlayStation 4 release following in June 2017.

Gameplay
JumpJet Rex is a 2D platform game, in which players control the eponymous character, a space-exploring tyrannosaurus equipped with jet-propelled boots. Rex's jet boots give him the ability to hover, dash and boost.

Development and release
Developed by TreeFortress Games, JumpJet Rex original began as a project for a game jam in 2014. The game takes inspiration from classic platform titles of the 8-bit and 16-bit eras, such as Mega Man and Sonic the Hedgehog.

An in-development version of the game was released commercially through Steam Early Access for Linux, OS X, and Windows on January 14, 2015. The early access release featured the first dozen levels of the game. The game exited the early access phase and received an official release for PC platforms on April 22, 2015. The game was later released on the Xbox One video game console on April 29, 2016.

Reception
JumpJet Rex received a "generally favourable" reception from critics, with aggregate review website Metacritic assigning a score of 76 out of 100 based on 11 reviews.

References

External links
 

2015 video games
Early access video games
Game jam video games
Linux games
MacOS games
Indie video games
Platform games
PlayStation 4 games
Video games developed in Canada
Windows games
Xbox One games
Dinosaurs in video games
TreeFortress Games games